Jan Ali or Jan'ali may refer to:
 Jan Ali, Kermanshah
 Jan Ali, Khuzestan
 Jan Ali, Sistan and Baluchestan